Jennifer Hoover (born October 12, 1969) is currently an assistant coach with the University of Kentucky women's basketball team since her appointment on July 11, 2022.

Career
She was previously the head coach at Wake Forest University for ten seasons prior to her dismissal two months earlier on May 11. She was succeeded by Megan Gebbia fifteen days later on May 26.

She played her collegiate career at Wake Forest and is the school's leading scorer and rebounder.

Wake Forest statistics
Source

Awards and honors
In 2007, Hoover was named to the Wake Forest Sports Hall of Fame.

In 2012, after leading High Point to a 20–13 record, Hoover was named the Maggie Dixon Division I Rookie Coach of the Year Award, awarded to a coach who achieves great success in their first year as a Division I head coach.

On March 4, 2021, Hoover became the winningest coach in Wake Forest history after beating North Carolina in the 2021 ACC women's basketball tournament.  The win gave Hoover 126 total wins as a coach at her alma mater.

Head coaching record

References

1969 births
Living people
American women's basketball coaches
California Golden Bears women's basketball coaches
East Carolina Pirates women's basketball coaches
James Madison Dukes women's basketball coaches
Memphis Tigers women's basketball coaches
VCU Rams women's basketball coaches
Virginia Cavaliers women's basketball coaches
Wake Forest Demon Deacons women's basketball coaches
Wake Forest Demon Deacons women's basketball players
High Point Panthers women's basketball coaches